Alfredo Toro Hardy (born in Caracas on May 22, 1950) is a Venezuelan retired career diplomat, scholar and public intellectual. During his diplomatic career, he occupied some of Venezuela's top ambassadorial posts, including Washington, London, Madrid, and Brasilia. As an academic, he has taught at several universities both in Venezuela and abroad, directed institutions in the field of foreign policy, and written extensively on international affairs. According to international relations best-selling author Parag Khanna: "Alfredo Toro Hardy is the quintessential scholar-diplomat". Renowned author and scholar Kishore Mahbubani wrote: "About 12% of the world's population lives in the West and 88% live outside. Yet, the strong, diverse voices of the 88% are rarely heard. Alfredo Toro Hardy provides one such voice that needs to be heard". British historian and author Robert Harvey stated: "One does not have to coincide with all of Toro Hardy's views in order to recognize that he is one of the most articulated and experienced voices not only from Latin America but from the developing world". Cambridge University scholar Geoffrey Hawthorn wrote: "Alfredo Toro Hardy has a rare and distinctive voice. No-one can come away from his essays without seeing the world in new ways". In recognition of his achievements in this field of knowledge, the Geneva School of Diplomacy and International Relations made him an Honorary Research Fellow in 2019.

Early life and education
He was born and raised in Caracas into a family renowned for its tradition of public service and by its intellectual, scientific, and artistic endeavours. According to former president of Venezuela Ramón J. Velásquez in the foreword of one of his books: "Alfredo Toro Hardy belongs to those Toro that for generations have been cultivating humanism, sciences, arts, and civic values, while always engaged in the Venezuelan historical process". This includes statesman and author Fermin Toro and Maria Teresa Rodriguez del Toro y Alayza, wife of South America's founding father Simón Bolívar, while also including Venezuela's independence forefather Francisco Rodríguez del Toro or world famous pianist Teresa Carreño (a member of the Toro family on her mother's side). His brother Jose Toro Hardy is also a well-known Venezuelan author and public figure with several published books on economics. His maternal grandparents (Hardy) were from Nantes, France, of Norman and Breton descent. Alfredo Toro Hardy graduated with a law degree from the Universidad Central de Venezuela, Caracas in 1973. Between 1973 and 1975 he made postgraduate studies in France under a scholarship of the French Government. He acquired a diploma in diplomatic studies from the Institut International d'Administration Publique (École nationale d'administration), and a certificate in comparative law from Panthéon-Assas University in Paris, 1975. He received his M.S. from the Universidad Central de Venezuela in 1977 and his Master of Laws from the University of Pennsylvania Law School in 1979. He took a course on international negotiations from Harvard University in 1984. In 2019, the Geneva School of Diplomacy and International Relations conferred on Toro Hardy the title of Doctor on International Relations.

Academic career
Alfredo Toro Hardy was an associate professor at the Simón Bolívar University from which he retired in 1992, he also taught for many years at the Central University of Venezuela. He served as Director of the Centre for North American Studies and Coordinator of the Institute for Higher Latin American Studies at the Simón Bolívar University from 1989 to 1992. A Visiting Professor at the Woodrow Wilson School of Public and International Affairs of Princeton University (1986–1987) and at the School of International Affairs of the University of Brasilia (1995–1996), he served as well as on-line Professor at the Centre for Social Economy of the University of Barcelona (2004–2005). He was a Fulbright Scholar (1986–1987) and a Director of the "Pedro Gual" Diplomatic Academy of the Venezuelan Ministry of Foreign Affairs from 1992 to 1994. Alfredo Toro Hardy was made a Member of the Advising Committee on diplomatic studies of the University of Westminster (2004–2008). He was also elected by the Council of Faculties of the University of Cambridge as Simón Bolívar Chair Professor for Latin American Studies for the period 2006–2007, but had to decline due to his diplomatic career (holders of this prestigious chair have included leading Latin American figures such as Octavio Paz, Mario Vargas Llosa, Fernando Henrique Cardoso, Carlos Fuentes or Celso Furtado). All along September 2011 and again during October 2017, the Rockefeller Foundation awarded Toro Hardy with a prestigious academic residency at its Bellagio Center in Italy, which for over six decades has included Nobel laureates, Pulitzer Prize winners, leading academics, artists, thought leaders, policymakers, and practitioners recognized for their bold thinking. He was also a Member of the Nominations Committee of the Bellagio Center Policy Fellows Program for the period 2014–2016. In May 2019, the Rockefeller Foundation invited him again to Bellagio to be one of the speakers of the 60th anniversary's homecoming celebration of the center.

He remains an active lecturer on international affairs, having been invited as speaker by top universities and think tanks, including Oxford, Cambridge, London School of Economics, University College London, Harvard, Brown, Princeton, Columbia, Johns Hopkins, British Columbia, Complutense University of Madrid, University of Copenhagen, National University of Singapore, Nanyang Technological University, National University of Malaysia, Jawaharlal Nehru University, University of Sao Paulo, Instituto Tecnológico de Monterrey, Council on Foreign Relations, Chatham House or Center for Strategic and International Studies, while participating in several international seminars. He is an advisory board member of the following think tanks and networks: Alexis Foundation (India),  Global Strategic Research Center (Venezuela) and Iberian American Network of Sinologists (Iberian Peninsula and Latin America). He is also a fellow of the Global Labor Organization (Germany), an associated researcher of the Galician Institute of International Analysis and Research (Spain), an honorary member of the University the Andes’ Chinese Studies Association (Venezuela), and an associate of the Singularity University Community (US), having been a member of Chatham House (UK), Canning House (UK), and the Windsor Energy Group (UK), among other similar institutions. He has integrated the academic councils of several electronic symposia on China organized by the Observatorio de la Política China (Spain).  Both the University of Pennsylvania and the Fulbright Program have included him in its "Notables List".

Books
He has authored twenty one books and co-authored fifteen more, most of which are on international affairs. His book El Desafío Venezolano: ¿Cómo Influir las Decisiones Políticas Estadounidenses? pioneered within Latin America the study of the United States institutional permeability as a means by the countries of that region to influence in their own benefit Washington's decision making process . This work was originally published in 1988 by the Institute for Higher Latin American Studies of the Simon Bolivar University with a foreword by Miguel Angel Burelli Rivas, Director of the aforementioned institution. The book had subsequent updated editions in 1991 and 2005. His book The Age of Villages with a foreword by Victor Bulmer-Thomas, Director of Chatham House, won the Latino Book Award in the category of contemporary history/political sciences at the BookExpo America celebrated in Chicago in 2003. His book Hegemonía e Imperio with a foreword by British historian Robert Harvey, won the same prize at the same category at the BookExpo America celebrated in Los Angeles in 2008. In between the latter two books, he published in 2004 ¿Tiene Futuro América Latina? with a foreword by Rubens Ricupero, Secretary-General of the UNCTAD. In 2013, World Scientific published Toro Hardy's book The World Turned Upside Down: The Complex Partnership Between China and Latin America under its prestigious Series on Contemporary China. The forewords of this work were written by Geoffrey Hawthorn, former Head of the Department of Politics and International Studies of the University of Cambridge, and L. Enrique García, President and CEO of CAF - Development Bank of Latin America. In an extensive bibliographical selection on South America, LibraryThing choose The World Turned Upside Down as one of the nine basic background readings to understand that region . In 2017, World Scientific published his book Understanding Latin America: A Decoding Guide. The forewords of the latter were written by Francisco Rojas Aravena, Rector of the United Nations University for Peace and Tommy Koh, former president of both the UN Security Council and UNCLOS. World Scientific published in 2018 another book of his entitled The Crossroads of Globalization: A Latin American View, with a foreword by Klaus Zimmermann, President of Global Labor Organization, Editor-in-Chief of Population Economics and Past President of the German Institute for Economic Research. In 2020, World Scientific published yet another book of his authorship entitled  China versus the U.S.: Who Will Prevail?, with a foreword by Roxane Farmanfarmaian, Director of Global Politics and International Studies at the Institute of Continuing Education of the University of Cambridge and former Editor-in-Chief of the Cambridge Review of International Affairs. In 2022 a new book by him, America's Two Cold Wars: From Hegemony to Decline? was published by Palgrave Macmillan. The latter has a foreword by National University of Singapore's Senior Fellow and two-time Pulitzer Prize finalist James M. Dorsey. Toro Hardy's books have been endorsed by Kishore Mahbubani, Bernardo Kliksberg, T.V. Paul, Zheng Yongnian, Moises Naim, James Dunkerley, Parag Khanna, Arturo Valenzuela, Richard Gott, Mark Leonard (director), Néstor Osorio Londoño, Michel Saloff Coste, or Jorge Alberto Lozoya, among other important figures. On the same token they have been reviewed or commented by international media, academic journals, think tanks or social networks such as Foreign Affairs, International Affairs (journal), Financial Times, CNBC, Americas Quarterly, BBC, RT, Le Monde Diplomatique, Global-is-Asian, New Books Network, The Economic Times, Global Policy Journal, Asia Sentinel, The Kootneeti, The Diplomat, Penn Law Journal, The China Quarterly, StratNewsGlobal, The Eurasia Center, Passport: The Society for Historians of American Foreign Relations Review, The Copenhagen Journal of Asian Studies, Consortium of Indo-Pacific Researchers, Russian International Affairs Council, World Geostrategic Insights, Indian Journal of Asian Affairs, Global Dialogue Review, Pulsul Geostrategic, London Politica, Risk Group, Fair Observer, The Peninsula Foundation, Usanas Foundation, or the Association for Indian Research Scholars. On the other hand, his co-authored books have been written jointly with distinguished personalites, including Rafael Caldera, Ramón J. Velásquez, Fernando Henrique Cardoso, Heraldo Muñoz, Juan Somavía, Arturo Sosa or Sir Timothy Garden.

Journals and media
He is a member of the editorial board of the peer-reviewed journals Alexis Journal of International Affairs (Alexis Foundation, India) and Cuadernos de China (University of the Andes, Venezuela). During the 1980s and the 1990s, he was a member of the editorial board of the peer-reviewed journal on international affairs Política Internacional, as well as of the economic analytical newspaper Economía Hoy. He has published numerous papers in academic journals from the Americas, Europe, and Asia, while being a senior weekly columnist at Venezuela's oldest newspaper El Universal, where he has been writing since 1992. Previously, he was a weekly columnist at El Diario de Caracas for over a decade. His articles have also been published by some of the major newspapers and magazines from Latin America and Spain and are customarily reproduced by blogs of different tendencies. He regularly contributes with the publications of two of Spain's top-ten think tanks (IGADI and Casa Asia), also contributing with the publications or webinars of several think tanks, among which Global Labor Organization (Germany), Global Diplomatic Forum (U.K.), The Kootneeti (India), Asia Power Watch (France) and La Palabra de Clio (Mexico).  All along 1993, he presented a TV Series on international history at Radio Caracas Television. Entitled Factor Mundial, the series traced major world events between World War I and the collapse of the Soviet Union.

Diplomatic career
Jointly with his international relations academic background, Alfredo Toro Hardy is also a seasoned practitioner of international affairs who was appointed to senior diplomatic positions. He held the rank of Ambassador under five successive Venezuelan presidential  administrations. As such, he is part of the small cohort of Latin Americans that have excelled in both aspects of this discipline. He began his career in 1976 as Joint Legal Counsel of the Foreign Trade Institute of the Venezuelan Ministry of Foreign Affairs, ending it in mid-2017 when he resigned to the foreign service, ahead of retirement age, as a result of events in his country. In 2004 he published an open letter in the Venezuelan press, expressing that he was a career civil servant and not a member or a follower of the ruling party. As a result of that open letter his appointement as Venezuelan Permanent Representative to the Organization of the United Nations (New York), already approved by his country's Congress and made public by the press, was revoked. It was finally decided, though, that he would remain as Ambassador to the U.K., where he was posted at the time. Among his postings were the following:
 Director of the "Pedro Gual" Diplomatic Academy of the Venezuelan Ministry of Foreign Affairs with the rank of Ambassador (1992-1994)
 Member of the Qualifying Jury of the Ministry of Foreign Affairs in charge of Diplomatic selections and promotions (1992-1994)
 Ambassador to the Federative Republic of Brazil (1994–1997)
 Ambassador to the Republic of Chile (1997–1999)
 Ambassador to the United States (1999–2001)
 Ambassador to the United Kingdom (2001–2007)
 Ambassador to the Republic of Ireland (2001–2007)
 Ambassador to the Kingdom of Spain (2007–2009)
 Ambassador to the Republic of Singapore (2009-2017)

Bibliography
Individual books:
 Control of Restrictive Practices in Industrial Property Matters in the United States and Venezuela (Philadelphia, 1979)
 Rafael Caldera (Caracas, 1983)
 ¿Para qué una Política Exterior? (Caracas, 1984)
 Venezuela, Democracia y Política Exterior (Caracas, 1986)
 El Desafío Venezolano: ¿Cómo Influir las Decisiones Políticas Estadounidenses? (Caracas, 1988, 1991, 2005)
 La Maldición de Sísifo: Quince Años de Política Exterior Venezolana (Caracas, 1991)
 Bajo el Signo de la Incertidumbre (Caracas, 1992)
 De Yalta a Sarajevo: De la Guerra Fría a la Paz Caliente (Caracas, 1993)
 Las Falacias del Libre Comercio (Caracas, 1993)
 Del Descalabro Mexicano a la Crisis Venezolana (Caracas, 1995)
 El Desorden Global (Caracas, 1996)
 La Era de las Aldeas / The Age of Villages (Bogota, 2002)
 La Guerra en Irak (Caracas, 2003)
 Irak y la Reconfiguración del Orden Mundial (Caracas, 2003)
 ¿Tiene Futuro América Latina? (Bogota, 2004)
 Los Estadounidenses (Caracas, 2005)
 Hegemonía e Imperio / Hegemony and Empire (Bogota, 2007)
 The World Turned Upside Down: The Complex Partnership Between China and Latin America (New Jersey, 2013)
 Understanding Latin America: A Decoding Guide (New Jersey, 2017)
 The Crossroads of Globalization: A Latin American View (New Jersey, 2018).
 China versus the U.S.: Who Will Prevail? (New Jersey, 2020).
 America's Two Cold Wars: From Hegemony to Decline? (London, 2022).

Co-authored books:
 Los Libertadores de Venezuela, Caracas, Ediciones Meneven, 1983 (jointly with Ramón J. Velásquez, Alfonso Rumazo González, J.A. de Armas Chitty, Aníbal Laydera Villalobos, Pedro Grases et al.)
 Venezuela Contemporánea, Caracas, Fundación Eugenio Mendoza, 1989 (jointly with Pedro Cunill Grau, Asdrúbal Baptista, Pedro A. Palma, Allan R. Brewer-Carías, Pedro Díaz Seijas et al.)
 Petróleo, Liberalismo y Nacionalismo, Caracas, Fundación de Estudios del Futuro, 1991 (jointly with Rafael Caldera, Domingo F. Maza Zavala, Teodoro Petkoff, Ovidio Pérez Morales et al.)
 Amazonas: Diagnóstico y Estrategia de Desarrollo, Caracas, Comisión Presidencial de Asuntos Fronterizos, 1992 (jointly with Ramón J. Velásquez, Alberto Lizarralde et al.)
 La Frontera Occidental de Venezuela: Propuestas de Política, Caracas, Comisión Presidencial de Asuntos Fronterizos Colombo-Venezolanos, 1992 (jointly with Ramón J. Velásquez, Edgar C. Otálvora, Pedro Cunill Grau, Alberto Muller Rojas, Elsa Cardozo de Da Silva et al.)
 Venezuela: Opciones para una Estrategia Económica, Caracas, Comisión Presidencial para la Reforma del Estado, 1993 (jointly with Edgar Paredes Pisani, Diego Bautista Urbaneja, Hector Silva Michelena, Armando Cordoba et al.)
 Ideas sobre el Porvenir de Venezuela, Caracas, Asociación Venezuela, Sociedad y Economía, 1993 (jointly with Asdrubal Baptista, Rafael Caldera, Enzo del Búfalo, Edgar Paredes Pisani, Ignacio Avalos et al.)
 Encuentro y Alternativas: Venezuela, 1994, Caracas, Conferencia Episcopal de Venezuela/Universidad Católica Andrés Bello, 1994 (jointly with Mons. Mario Moronta, Arturo Sosa, S.J., Domingo F. Maza Zavala, Asdrúbal Baptista, Bernardo Mommer et al.)  
 MERCOSUR-NAFTA, São Paulo, Universidade de São Paulo/Parlamento Latinoamericano, 1994 (jointly with Raúl Alfonsín, Celso Lafer, Franco Montoro, Heraldo Muñoz, Paulo de Tarso, Marco Aurelio García, Rubens Barbosa et al.)
 Democracia: A Grande Rovolucao, Brasília, Universidade de Brasília, 1996 (jointly with Fernando Henrique Cardoso, Rafael Caldera, Juan Somavía, Heraldo Muñoz, Jeliu Jelev, Joao Claudio Todorov et al.)
 MERCOSUR-Venezuela, São Paulo, Parlamento Latinoamericano/Embaixada da Venezuela no Brasil, 1995 (Co-editor. Jointly with Luiz Felipe Lampreia, Alvaro Ramos Trigo, Miguel Angel Burelli Rivas, Allan Wagner Tizón, Dorothea Werneck, Franco Montoro et al.)
 Abriendo Caminos para la Historia, Caracas, Editorial Panapo/Embajada de Venezuela en Brasil, 1997 (Editor. Rafael Caldera, Fernando Henrique Cardoso, Franco Montoro, Roberto Requiao, Atila Lins, Carlos Fernando Mathias de Sousa et al.) 
 Gobernanza: Laberinto de la Democracia, Caracas, Capítulo Venezolano del Club de Roma, 2005 (jointly with Arnoldo José Gabaldón, Margarita López Maya, Mercedez Pulido de Briceño, María Ramírez Ribes, Heinz Sonntag et al.)
 The Impact of Technology on Intelligence and Security, London, The Diplomatic Academy of London/University of Westminster, 2006 (jointly with Jurgen Mertens, Sir Michael Alexander, Margaret Blunden, Sir Timothy Garden, Michael K. Simpson, Colin Adamson-Macedo, et al.)
 Studies on the Relation between China and Latin America 2015 (Mandarin edition), Xuzhou, Jiangsu Normal University, 2016 (jointly with Zhu Lun, Xulio Ríos, Roger Cornejo, Roberto Mansilla Blanco, Gustavo Alejandro Girado, et al.)

Academic papers:

More than thirty academic papers on international affairs published on peer reviewed journals, including Cambridge Review of International Affairs (Centre of International Studies, University of Cambridge, UK); Política Externa (Centro de Pesquisa em Relações Internationaes, Universidade de São Paulo, Brazil); Política Internacional (Asociación Política Internacional, Venezuela); Journal of Jiangsu Normal University (Tsinghua Tongfang Knowledge Network Technology, China); Revista Diplomacia, Estratégia, Política, (Ministerio das Relações Exteriores-Fundação Alexandre de Gusmao, Brazil); GLO Discussion Papers (Global Labor Organization, Germany); Humania del Sur (Universidad de Los Andes, Venezuela); Global Dialogue Review (Global Dialogue Forum, India); Revista de Historia Actual (Grupo de Estudios de Historia Actual, Universidad de Cádiz, Spain); Jiexi Zhongguo: Análisis y Pensamiento Iberoamericano sobre China (Observatorio de la Política China, Spain); Tempo Exterior: Revista de Análise e Estudos Internacionais (Instituto Galego de Análise e Documentación Internacional, Spain); Indian Journal of Asian Affairs (India); Revista Politeia (Instituto de Estudios Políticos, Universidad Central de Venezuela, Venezuela); Revista Ciencia Política (Tierra Firme Editores, Colombia); Boletín de la Academia de Ciencias Políticas y Sociales (Academia de Ciencias Políticas y Sociales, Venezuela); Cuadernos de China (Universidad de los Andes, Venezuela); Universalia (Decanato de Estudios Generales, Universidad Simón Bolívar, Venezuela); inter alia.

See also
Venezuela

References

External links

1950 births
Living people
Ambassadors of Venezuela to the Bahamas
Ambassadors of Venezuela to Brazil
Ambassadors of Venezuela to Chile
Ambassadors of Venezuela to Ireland
Ambassadors of Venezuela to Spain
Ambassadors of Venezuela to the United Kingdom
Ambassadors of Venezuela to the United States
People from Caracas
Central University of Venezuela alumni
University of Pennsylvania Law School alumni
École nationale d'administration alumni
University of Paris alumni
Venezuelan male writers
Harvard University alumni
Latin Americanists
Sinologists
Historians of Latin America
International relations scholars
Chatham House people
Fulbright alumni